Madame de Thèbes (1860–1937), pseudonym of Anne Victorine Savigny was a French clairvoyant and palm reader. She plied her trade from her living room at No. 29 Avenue de Wagram in Paris. Every Christmas, she published her prophecies in an Almanac, which enjoyed wide circulation. She was said to have predicted:
 The Boer War;
 The Russo-Japanese War;
 Triggers of World War I;
 The violent death of General Boulanger;
 The tragic death of Catulle Mendès;
 The death of William Thomas Stead;
 The case of Caillaux.

She published the book The Enigma of the Dream: Explanation of Dreams in 1908. She died in Paris in 1937 at the age of 77.

References

External links
 

Clairvoyants
Divination
1845 births
1916 deaths
19th-century occultists